Abū Bakr Muḥammad ibn al-Qāsim ibn Muḥammad ibn Bashār al-Anbārī (885–940 AD), also known simply as Ibn al-Anbari, was a well known Arab philologist and grammarian of the Abbasid Caliphate.

Life 
He was born in Baghdad, were he spent most of his life. According to Hatim Salih al-Damin in his book al-Zāhir fī maʿānī kalimāt al-nās, Ibn Al-Anbari received education from many teachers including his father Abu Muhammad al-Anbari(d. 916/917), Abu al-ʽAbbas Thaʽlab (d. 904) and Ibn Duraid (d. 953).

Works 
Among his works are the following:
 Sharh al-Qasai'd al-Saba' al-Tiwal al-Jahiliyyat
 Al Ha'at fi Kitab Allah

See also 
 List of pre-modern Arab scientists and scholars

References 

10th-century Arabs
10th-century people from the Abbasid Caliphate
885 births
940 deaths
10th-century philologists
Scholars from the Abbasid Caliphate
Arab grammarians
Arab linguists
Medieval grammarians of Arabic
People from Baghdad